Qullqayuq (Quechua qullqa, deposit, storehouse, -yuq a suffix to indicate ownership, "the one with a deposit", Hispanicized spelling Culcayoc) is a mountain in the Cordillera Central in the Andes of Peru, about  high. It is situated in the Lima Region, Huarochiri Province, San Mateo District. Qullqayuq lies south of Quri, southwest of the lake named Wallaqucha and northwest of Qarwachuku of the Paryaqaqa or Waruchiri mountain range.

References

Mountains of Peru
Mountains of Lima Region